"Just as Long as I Have You" is a song written by Dave Loggins and J.D. Martin. Loggins originally recorded the song with Gus Hardin in 1985. Their version peaked at number 72 on the Billboard Hot Country Singles chart.

The song was later covered by American country music artist Don Williams.  It was released in January 1990 as the third single from Williams' album One Good Well.  His version reached number 4 on the Billboard Hot Country Singles & Tracks chart.

Chart performance

Gus Hardin and Dave Loggins

Don Williams

Year-end charts

References

1985 singles
1990 singles
Dave Loggins songs
Gus Hardin songs
Don Williams songs
Songs written by Dave Loggins
Songs written by J. D. Martin (songwriter)
Song recordings produced by Garth Fundis
Male vocal duets
RCA Records singles
1985 songs